The Chaitanya Charitamrita, composed by Krishnadasa Kaviraja in  1557, is written in Bengali with a great number of Sanskrit verses in its devotional, poetic construction, including Shikshashtakam. It is one of the primary biographies detailing the life and teachings of Caitanya Mahāprabhu, the founder of Gaudiya Vaishnavism. The stories of Chaitanya's life are mixed with philosophical conversations detailing the process of Bhakti yoga, with special attention given to congregational chanting of Krishna's names and the Hare Krishna mantra.

Contents

The Chaitanya Caritamrta is divided into three sections: Adi-lila, Madhya-lila and Antya-lila. Each section refers to a particular phase in Chaitanya Mahaprabhu's life:

Adi-lila
The Adi-lila explains Chaitanya's unique theological identity (Krishna in the mood of Radharani—a combined avatar), his lineage, his closest childhood companions and their lineage, and his devotional associates. It ends with a brief summary of his life up to his acceptance of sannyasa.

In the conversation with Chand Kazi (the Muslim ruler at the time), the word 'hindu' is used repeatedly for the inhabitants of Nabadwip who were not Muslims.

Madhya-lila
The Madhya-lila details Chaitanya's sannyasa; Madhavendra Puri's life; Chaitanya's philosophical conversation with Sarvabhauma Bhattacharya (Advaitin scholar) promoting bhakti as supreme over the impersonal view; Chaitanya's pilgrimage to South India; the daily and annual activities of Chaitanya and his devotees during the Ratha Yatra festival near Jagannath Temple (Puri, Odisha); their observance of other festivities; and Chaitanya's instructions on the process of Bhakti yoga to both Rupa Goswami and Sanatana Goswami.

Antya-lila
The Antya-lila describes the devotional plays composed by Rupa Goswami, Chaitanya's interactions with the occasional critics as well as his devotees such as Raghunatha dasa Goswami and Jagadananda Pandita, and Chaitanya's increasing agony of separation from Krishna (viraha or vipralambha bhava). It concludes with the Chaitanya's Shikshashtakam (eight verses of poetic instruction).

Composition of the Chaitanya Charitamrita
Although the author, Krishnadasa Kaviraja, never met Chaitanya Mahaprabhu personally, his guru, Raghunatha dasa Goswami, was an associate of Chaitanya and was close to others who were intimates of his. In composing his work, Krishnadasa Kaviraja also referred to the Shri Krishna Chaitanya Charanamrita of Murari Gupta and also the works of Svarupa Damodara, both of whom knew Chaitanya.

Krishna Dasa Kaviraja composed the Chaitanya Charitamrita in his old age after being requested by the Vaishnavas of Vrindavana to write a hagiography about the life of Chaitanya. Although there was already a biography written by Vrindavana Dasa, called the Chaitanya Bhagavata, the later years of Chaitanya's life were not detailed in that work. Krishna Dasa's Chaitanya Charitamrita covers Chaitanya's later years and also explains in detail the rasa philosophy that Chaitanya and his followers expounded. The Chaitanya Charitamrita also serves as a compendium of Gaudiya Vaishnava practices and outlines the Gaudiya theology developed by the Goswamis in metaphysics, ontology and aesthetics.

The Chaitanya Charitamrita was frequently copied and widely circulated amongst the Vaishnava communities of Bengal and Odisha during the early 17th Century. Its popularity during this period can be attributed to the propagation of three Vaishnava preachers—Narottama Dasa, Shyamananda and Srinivasa—who were trained by Jiva Goswami and Krishnadasa Kaviraja himself.

Modern publication
In 1974, A. C. Bhaktivedanta Swami Prabhupada published Śrī Caitanya-caritāmṛta in English as a 17-volume set of books. It contains the original verses, romanized transliterations, word-for-word meanings, translations, and commentaries. His commentaries are based on Bhaktivinoda Thakur's Amrita Pravaha and Bhaktisiddhanta Sarasvati's Anubhasya commentaries. His publication popularized the Chaitanya Charitamrita outside of India and has been distributed in mass quantities worldwide.

See also

Bhagavad Gita
Bhagavata Purana
Chaitanya Bhagavata
Gouranga
Hare Krishna (mantra)
Nityananda
Pancha Tattva
Six Goswamis of Vrindavan

References

Bibliography
Publications
 Sri Chaitanya-charitamrta (Bengali), published by Sri Chaitanya Matha. Kolkata, 1992.

Printed sources
 

 

Web sources
 

Bengali-language literature
16th-century Indian books
Gaudiya Vaishnavism
Books of Hindu biography